Chiemsee is a freshwater lake in Bavaria, Germany, near Rosenheim. It is often called "the Bavarian Sea". The rivers Tiroler Achen and Prien flow into the lake from the south, and the river Alz flows out towards the north. The Alz flows into the Inn which then merges with the Danube.

The Chiemgau, the region surrounding the Chiemsee, is a popular recreation area.

Origin 
The Chiemsee was formed, like many other pre-alpine lakes, at the end of the last ice age about 10,000 years ago from a hollow carved out by a glacier (a ). Originally the lake covered an area of almost , which is about three times its present area. Before 1904 the water level was lowered by about a metre. As a result, large areas of dry land were reclaimed.

Islands
Herreninsel has a palace built by King Ludwig II in 1878 called , which was never completed but was meant to be a replica of the Palace of Versailles. Many of its rooms are open to tourists; tours of the palace and its extensive grounds are conducted throughout the summer.
Frauenchiemsee, the smaller of the two main islands, houses a Benedictine nunnery, built in 782, as well as a small village. The nuns make a liquor called  ("cloister liquor") and marzipan (almond paste).

This tiny island had probably been created artificially to mark a shallow spot for sailboats. There is a willow on the island, originally planted in 1935, and replaced by a young tree in the 2000s.

AFRC Lake Hotel
On 1 September 1938 the first Autobahn rest house opened on the A8 on the outskirts of Bernau am Chiemsee on the lake’s southern shore. From 1945 until 2 September 2003 the building served as an Armed Forces Recreation Center called the Lake Hotel. The building is now an orthopaedic clinic.

References

External links 

 

Lakes of Bavaria
Ramsar sites in Germany
Tourist attractions in Bavaria
LChiemsee